Brindle is a civil parish in the Borough of Chorley, Lancashire, England.   The parish contains 26 buildings that are recorded in the National Heritage List for England as designated listed buildings. Of these, two are listed at Grade II*, the middle grade, and the others are at Grade II, the lowest grade.  Apart from the village of Brindle, the parish is mainly rural, and a high proportion of the listed buildings are, or originated as, farmhouses or farm buildings.  The Leeds and Liverpool Canal passes through the parish, as does the disused southern section of the Lancaster Canal, and there are listed buildings associated with both of these. The other listed buildings are churches and houses, and structures associated with them.

Key

Buildings

References

Citations

Sources

Lists of listed buildings in Lancashire
Buildings and structures in the Borough of Chorley